is a Japanese tenor singer. He has released a number of CDs, in which he has sung a broad range of genres, from classical to pop.  He appeared on the 57th NHK Kōhaku Uta Gassen broadcast.

Biography
His single  (released 24 May 2006) made it to No.1 on 22 January 2007 Oricon Singles Weekly Ranking following his appearance on Uta Gassen. Based on the poem Do not stand at my grave and weep, the single has since sold in excess of 1,000,000 copies in Japan. and Korean version released in 2014 for Sewol victim

See also 
 Barefoot Gen (TV drama) (2007)

References

External links 
  Official website

1967 births
Japanese classical musicians
Japanese tenors
Living people
Musicians from Ehime Prefecture
21st-century Japanese male opera singers